Bhavishyachi Aishi Taishi - The Prediction is an Indian Marathi language film releasing on 6 October 2017. It is a story of three young Maharashrian girls working and staying together with different views on life in general. All is well in their small world until a fateful day when an encounter with an astrologer changes their lives forever.

Cast

 Varsha Usgaonkar
 Sundeep Kochar
 Manasi Naik
 Ruchita Jadhav
 Karol Zine
 Asawari Joshi
 Kishor Nandlaskar
 Ananda Karekar

Media Mentions

ozee 
Mega Marathi 
Now Running 
Bollywood Trade
Gomolo

References

External links
 

2017 films
2010s Marathi-language films
Indian romantic comedy films
Indian teen romance films
2017 romantic comedy films